Amnon Yitzhak (born 8 November  1953) is a Haredi Israeli rabbi. He is best known for his involvement in Orthodox Judaism outreach (kiruv) among Israel's Sephardi and Mizrahi populations. He and Rabbi Reuven Elbaz are considered the leaders of the Sephardi baal teshuva movement in Israel. He is involved in activities centered on helping Jews to become more religious or observant through public speaking in Israel and around the world, and his 'Shofar' organization, which distributes his lectures in various media and on the internet.

Biography
Amnon Yitzhak was born to Yahya Zechariah Yitzchak and Rumia Yitzchak in Tel Aviv, Israel to a Yemenite Jewish family. He was brought up in a non-religious home, and became religious at the age of 24, after stumbling across the sefer Kitzur Shulchan Aruch, that he received for his Bar Mitzvah.

In 1986, he established the non-profit organization 'Shofar' for promoting the "return to religion" among the Jewish Israeli population. His lectures and other activities have made Yitzhak a prominent Israeli rabbi since the early 1990s. Through 'Shofar', Yitzhak has launched two widely distributed weekly newspapers, Arba Kanfot and Shofar News geared to the Haredi public and general public respectively. They ceased publication in 2008.

Views on secular Zionism
Yitzhak has also addressed the issue of the secular Zionist leadership, and has released, for example, a video titled "Herzl and Zionism", which presents a critical view of both. Yitzhak has said, referring to Theodor Herzl, "There have been two great criminals in the history of the Jewish people: Hitler and Herzl. Hitler wanted to destroy the body of the Jewish nation. Herzl wanted to kill the soul, which is far more important than the body."

In a cassette titled "In the Shadow of Democracy", he strongly criticizes the State of Israel and the leadership for their attitude towards the Mizrahi-traditional and Haredi Jewish public, especially during the period of the Holocaust. Like them, he boycotts the Knesset elections. This view is extremely rare among the Haredi-Mizrahi public, and even rarer among Mizrahi newly-observant Jews - Amnon Yitzhak's primary target audience." Nonetheless, he had announced his guiding and leadership (the rabbi himself was outside the political list and was not running himself to the 19th Knesset) of the Israeli political party Koah Lehashpi'a for the 2013 Knesset elections in late November 2012. His party did not pass the election threshold, and therefore did not enter to the 19th Knesset. The party received 28,000 votes.

Views on women
In 2013, Yitzhak asserted that women should not drive cars, claiming "It is immodest for a woman to drive".

See also
Baal teshuva
Baal teshuva movement
Haredim and Zionism

References

External links
Shofar organization
Shofar news
Tear Gas and Massive Brawl at Amnon Yitzchak’s Lecture

1954 births
Living people
Sephardic Haredi rabbis in Israel
Yemenite Orthodox rabbis
Orthodox Jewish outreach
Baalei teshuva
Haredi rabbis in Israel
20th-century Israeli rabbis
21st-century Israeli rabbis
Anti-Zionist Haredi rabbis